Arslan Sharaputdinovich Khalimbekov (born 21 August 1967) is a Russian football manager and a former player. He is the manager of FC Ufa.

Personal life
His son Rustam Khalimbekov is a professional football player.

External links
 

1967 births
Footballers from Makhachkala
Living people
Soviet footballers
Russian footballers
Association football midfielders
FC Dynamo Makhachkala players
FC Anzhi Makhachkala players
Russian football managers
FC Ufa managers